Maasin (IPA: [mɐ'ʔasɪn]), officially the City of Maasin, is a 4th class component city and capital of the province of Southern Leyte, Philippines. According to the 2020 census, it has a population of 87,446 people.

Maasin City is the commercial and religious center of Southern Leyte and the south-western part of Leyte Island. On August 10, 2000, Maasin was converted into a city. The Diocese of Maasin was founded on August 14, 1968.

History 

In 1521, a Portuguese-born Spanish explorer and navigator, Ferdinand Magellan and his crew came ashore and celebrated the first Roman Catholic Mass on the island.  Magellan made peace with two Filipino rulers, Rajah Kolambu and Rajah Siani who subsequently were converted to Christianity.  A marker notes the spot on Limasawa where their blood compact of friendship and alliance was sealed.

Southern Leyte, for centuries, was actually an integral part of the island of Leyte.  During the Spanish period, the region was sparsely populated.  Continued Moro slave raiding discouraged the establishment and stabilization of other large towns.  In the 19th century, immigration from the provinces of Cebu and Bohol increased the population of the region and opened the land towards farming.

One of the oldest towns in Southern Leyte is Maasin, nowadays called Maasin City.  Little is known about its pre-Spanish existence.  When the Spanish missionaries became active in their missions, they discovered that the Maasin community was already organized, with its people friendly and interested in embracing the Catholic faith.  The community was formally established as a parish by the missionaries of the Society of Jesus in the 1700s and was called "nipa".  This was authenticated by a piece of stone from a long destroyed convent that bears the inscription: "Pa. De Tagnipa - año 1776."

The renaming of the town of Maasin is related to the incident when some Spaniards, who needed drinking water, scanned the shorelines and found Canturing River.  They asked the natives in Castillan Spanish while gesturing towards the river, "Que pueblo es este?" Without hesitation, the natives answered "Maasin" (meaning salty), thinking that the Spaniards were asking them how the water tasted.  From that time on, the place has been called Maasin.

The town grew rapidly in the 1700s after the Jesuit priests built the first church of which ruins still exists today between the two districts of Abgao and Mantahan. The Jesuit administration prevailed from 1700 through 1768.  Subsequently, Augustinian fathers took over the parish from 1768 to 1843 during which the townspeople, with the guidance of the Spanish ecclesiastical authorities, built the town's second concrete church located approximately one kilometer away from the ruins of the first one.  The church stands to this day; although it underwent several repairs and renovations on account of damage wrought by the forces of nature and man-made events.  In 1843, Franciscan missionaries took over the parish and managed it until 1896 when they were forced to abandon it due to the revolution.  A native clergy took over there after.

During the Spanish regime, Maasin evolved and became an organized municipality.  It became a busy seaport which maintained trading with nearby islands of Cebu, Bohol, and Mindanao.  A historical proof of this account is a document that depicts a record of "gobernacillos" in this municipality in 1880 through 1894.  By virtue of the Maura Code passed by the Spanish Cortez, the first chosen local executive was changed from Gobernadorcillo to "Capitan Municipal".  The last gobernadorcillo was Alejo Alcantara who served from 1892 to 1894, followed by Capitanes Municipal Julio Raagas (1894-1896) and Flaviano Aguilar (1897-1898).

The short-lived Philippine revolution against Spain brought about a change in the local government. During the early part of 1899, General Lukban came to Maasin to install the municipal government under the short-lived Philippine Republic.  Even before the fall of the Spaniards to the Americans on August 13, 1898, there had already been established in Maasin a Court of First Instance; the office of "Promoter Fiscal" (equivalent to the Provincial Fiscal); and, the office of "Administrador de Hacienda" (equivalent to Provincial Treasurer).  With the change of sovereign power, the positions were abolished but the Fiscal's which continued to serve cases from distant towns.  However, due to the problems emanating from transportation availability for the Tacloban-Maasin span, and the intricate management of governmental affairs in Tacloban, several prominent leaders of the west coast of Leyte began proposing bills that entail the division of the island of Leyte into two distinct provinces.

In 1919, Representative Ciriaco K. Kangleon presented the first bill but lost in the Senate by one vote.

In 1922, Tomas Oppus renewed the move with presentation of House Bill No. 254 which became Act No. 3117. Unfortunately, the Act did not take effect because it was not proclaimed by the Governor-General.

The arrival of the Americans at the beginning of the 20th century and the suppression of all resistance to the American rule stopped all dreams of Philippine independence. However, the epoch-making announcement of President McKinley that the Philippines was not theirs to exploit but to train in the art of self-government and independence brought about new hope for the Filipinos.  True to their word, the Americans instituted in this country their democratic institutions. Maasin was one of the beneficiaries of this enlightened American policy.  Schools were established; businesses began to rise and prosper; and, Maasin became the most progressive town in south-western Leyte (and still is).  Maasin was enjoying the blessings of democracy up until the eruption of World War II.

On June 3, 1942, the Japanese occupied Maasin and immediately instituted Martial Law.  Many townspeople realized that their immediate task was to live and escape the abuses, atrocities, and murderous acts of the Japanese soldiers.  They took refuge at the mountains and hills where they lived on the natural provisions of Mother Nature.  Many brave ones, including Colonel Ruperto Kangleon, Alfonso Cobile and others, fought the Japanese invaders making the record of the Maasin guerillas one glorious chapter in Maasin history.

Maasin resumed its path to prosperity when the Americans returned in late 1944.  It became, once again, a bustling seacoast town trading with the nearby islands of Cebu, Bohol, and Mindanao.  Through the initiatives of its leaders, Maasin progressively continued to move forward in its role as the center of commerce and industry in Southern Leyte.

In 1953, Francisco M. Pajao won the re-presentation of the issue that entails the division of the island of Leyte but could not do anything else to complete the move.  Hence, Senator Ruperto K. Kangleon, younger brother of Ciriaco K. Kangleon, presented and passed the move under Senate Bill No. 2140.  The House of Representatives carpeted the Bill.

Then in 1957, Congressman Nicanor Espina Yniguez Jr. filed the House Bill that changed the move's original designation as Western Leyte of Occidental Leyte to "Southern Leyte".  At 10:00 AM on Friday, May 22, 1959, President Carlos P. Garcia signed the Bill into law as Republic Act No. 2227.  Witnesses to the signing, among others, were Congressman Yniguez, Mayor Alfredo K. Bantug of Maasin, Attorney Manuel Enage Sr., Erlinda Capili, and Attorney Floro Kangleon.

On July 1, 1960, Southern Leyte was officially inaugurated as a province with municipalities including Maasin (being the capital town and seat of the provincial government), Malitbog, Bontoc, Sogod, Libagon, Pintuyan, San Francisco, St. Bernard, Cabalian (now San Juan), Anahawan, Hinundayan, Hinunangan, and Silago.  Three more municipalities were subsequently created, namely, San Ricardo (from Pintuyan), Tomas Oppus (from Malitbog), and Limasawa (from Padre Burgos).

Maasin continued to progressively prosper for decades.  On April 8, 1998, Congressman Aniceto G. Saludo Jr. filed a move under House Bill No. 7201 to convert the municipality of Maasin into a component city of the province of Southern Leyte, thus becoming Maasin City.

Geography

Topography
The terrain of Southern Leyte is characterized by relatively flat lands along the coastal plains where population areas lay, and becomes rugged and mountainous towards the interior.  It has numerous small rivers in addition to, at least, eleven major rivers which include Canturing River in Maasin City, Amparo River in Macrohon, Divisoria River in Bontoc, Subang Daku in Sogod, Lawigan and Hitongao Rivers in St. Bernard, Camugao River in Hinundayan, Magcasa River in San Juan, Das-ay and Pondol Rivers in Hinunangan, and Maag River in Silago.

Climate

Even though March–May is considered hot and dry with temperatures ranging from 22 to 32 °C, in general terms, the province actually has no dry season. This is due to rainfall more or less, distributed throughout the year. June to October is mostly rainy; whereas, November to February is cool with temperatures ranging from 22 to 28 °C. Year round, average humidity is about 76%.

Barangays
Maasin City is politically subdivided into 70 barangays.

Demographics

Language
Maasinhons and Southern Leyteños speak Cebuano. Their cultural and linguistic affinities tend to differentiate them from those who reside in Cebu, Bohol, and the western coast of the province of Leyte. Most of the people are farmers and fishermen who are noted for their hard work and frugality.

Religion
Although approximately 50% of the people are adherents of the Roman Catholic Church and the others called themselves the believer of true GOD, traditional folk beliefs and superstition still influence some of them. Some farmers are also known to hold on to pre-and conservative beliefs in making offerings and sacrifices before planting season starts. At times, chickens or pigs are ritually offered in hopes of enticing spirits for a fruitful harvest.

Diocese of Maasin
On August 14, 1968, the Diocese of Maasin was canonically erected through a papal decree issued March 23, 1968. In June of the same year, the Most Reverend Vicente T. Ataviado, D.D. who was up to then a parish priest of Masbate, Masbate, was appointed as its first bishop. He was consecrated on August 8, 1968, and installed as the First Bishop of Maasin on August 14 at Our Lady of Assumption Parish Church in Maasin, the capital of Southern Leyte.

From 1595 to 1910, the area which now comprises the Diocese of Maasin belonged to the diocese of Cebu. From 1910 to 1937 it belonged to the Diocese of Calbayog. From 1937 to 1968 it came under the jurisdiction of the Diocesan of Palo in Leyte. Today it is a suffragan of the Archdiocese of Cebu.

The diocese comprises the entire province of Southern Leyte, and the towns of Matalom, Bato, Hilongos, Hindang, Inopacan and Baybay in the province of Leyte, with the Maasin Parish Cathedral as the seat of the diocese. Distributed within its 2,505 square kilometers of land are 38 parishes and 1 quasi-parish. To facilitate administration these parishes have been grouped under 6 vicariates.

In recent years, awareness of their potent role in the local church has been perceived among the lay faithful – a result of diocesan programs designed to awaken the "sleeping giant" in the church. There has been a marked increase in the number of lay ministers to assist priests in every parish, as there has been in the number of volunteer catechists.

The Diocese of Maasin today has started to focus on the vision of the Second Plenary Council of the Philippines. Apart from the usual ministerial and sacramental functions, the clergy has succeeded to penetrate the people's conscience with concern for other issues, such as reforestation, among others.

The Social Action Center has generously offered help in livelihood projects to those who do not have the necessary capital. This has been successful in the abaca business enterprise. The center is now in the process of opening up more opportunities for more livelihood projects.

The Commission on Youth is helping in the formation of the youth in all the parishes of the diocese through youth encounters and leadership training. It has organized three diocesan summer youth camps between 1993 and 1995, attended by more than a thousand delegates.

In 1993 the Diocese of Maasin marked its 25th anniversary as a diocese.

Economy

Banks
 Bank of the Philippine Islands (BPI Family Saving's Bank)
 Metrobank
 Land Bank of the Philippines
 EastWest Rural Bank (formerly Green Bank)
 Asia United Bank
 EastWest Bank
 Rural Bank of Maasin Southern Leyte Inc. (RBM)
 Banco de Oro
 Chinabank
 Philippine National Bank
 Network Consolidated Cooperative Bank (NCCB)
 First Consolidated Bank (FCB)
 Development Bank of the Philippines
 Rizal Commercial Banking Corporation

Shopping centers
 Gaisano Metro Maasin (For Expansion on 2018)
 Gaisano Grand Mall Maasin (Under Construction)
 CITI Hardware (First in So. Leyte)
 NOVO Department Store
 J&F Department Store
 Prince Hypermart Maasin
 578 Emporium Maasin
 Brodeth One Stop Shop (BOSS)
 J&C Lucky 99 Store Maasin
 Maasin Star
 JW Enterprises
 HM Enterprises
 Fashion World Maasin Branch
 Grab & Go Maasin
 F&F Forever

Infrastructure

Roads
The existing road networks criss-crossing Southern Leyte consists of major arterial highways that link to the province of Leyte, passing through two major outlets - on the western part, the Maasin-Mahaplag-Baybay route; and, on the central part, the Mahaplag-Sogod route via the Maharlika Highway.

Airport
The province has one existing airstrip located in Panan-awan, Maasin City.  This airstrip, which has a runway length of 1200 meters and a width of 30 meters, is simply considered a feeder landing pad. There are regular scheduled flights between Cebu and Maasin and Tagbilaran to Maasin via Air Juan (AO).  The runway is suspected to be incapable of supporting aircraft weighing over 12,000 pounds. Controversies of the construction of the airport was found by COA, that lead Damian Mercado dismissed to his position.

Seaports
Weesam Express fast ferry from Maasin National Port to Cebu takes three hours, 9:00AM daily .
Cokaliong Shipping 'Roll-on' ships make four trips weekly each way, with a sailing time between five and seven hours. Cokaliong ships also carry cargo and vehicles.
Cargo ships regularly make use of Maasin National Port mainly bringing in cement and taking out copra.

Bus Terminals
There are five designated bus terminals in Southern Leyte: Maasin, Liloan, Sogod, Hinunangan, and Silago.  These terminals are just open spaces used by buses as parking/passenger waiting areas, and not equipped with buildings and other facilities.

There are at least four bus companies taking the Manila-Maasin route: Philtranco, DLTB, Ultrabus, and CUL. Bachelor takes the Ormoc-Maasin-Davao route.

From the Maasin City, by land, it takes approximately five hours to travel to Tacloban City; twenty three hours to Pasay or Quezon City; and, nineteen hours to Davao City via Liloan ferry boat.

Power / Energy
The principal source of power / electricity in Southern Leyte is the Tonongan Geothermal Power Plant in Ormoc via National Power Corporation through the Southern Leyte Electric Cooperative (SOLECO).  The major power transmission lines in the province emanate from 69 kV Tolosa, Leyte which is connected to 69 kV Bontoc, Southern Leyte then to Maasin City, and 69 kV Baybay, Leyte to Maasin City in case of power failure.

A mini-hydro electric power plant in Hinabian, Catmon, St. Bernard was developed with a capacity of 810 KW to serve the Pacific towns particularly St. Bernard and San Juan.

A major breakthrough in power generation is the Southern Leyte Geothermal Project in San Juan with a capacity of 50-100 megawatts commissioning in year 2003.  It is anticipated to sustain an estimated economic life of 25 years.  Activities involving Pre-operation Phase was already initiated.

Communication
Postal communication system is the major means of communication in all municipalities of the province.  There are five telephone exchange companies operating in the province to provide domestic and international calls namely PLDT, PT&T, RCPI/Bayan Tel, Evtelco, and the Bureau of Telecommunications (Butel); two AM radio stations - DYSL in Sogod, and DYDM in Maasin City.  Other modes of communication include SSB radios for government offices, and cellular phones for government and private entities. TV5, GMA Network and ABS-CBN operate upcoming TV station in the city.

Health Facilities
In 1996, the health and medical needs of the province were provided by eight government hospitals, six private hospitals and clinics, twenty rural health units or municipal centers, ninety three health stations, and ten outpatient private clinics. The total bed capacity of government hospitals is 265 while that of the private is 110.  A current tally of health facilities in the province is still being determined.

Maasin City also knowned to be the no-smoking capital city in Eastern Visayas.

Tourism

Maasin Cathedral built in the 17th century is probably not only the biggest, but also the oldest church in Maasin City. It is a diocesan seat since 1968. The church is adorned or embellished with an ornate altar and images of saints, and became a testament to the religious devotion of the people of Southern Leyte.

Don Anatalio Gaviola Plaza, which is dedicated to a then Mayor of Maasin. It still is one of the highly recommended stumping points for tourists as well as for locals.

The Guinsohotan Cave is a large cave, 15 km from the city center and 276 meters above sea level. Those who do enter the cave by wading or swimming can find small “in-cave” waterfalls, bats and impressive rock formations.

Cagnituan Lagoon, the water coming out of Guinsohotan Cave flows down in cascades to form a natural lagoon frequently visited by bathers and patrons of cool therapeutic treatment.

The two sights (Guinsohotan Cave and Cagnituan Lagoon), which belong more or less together, are placed in Barangay Canitoan and can be reached from Barangay Maria Clara by using a Habal-habal. The last part of the way is a walking part: you pass by small groups of houses, fields and palms. In the background there are the mountains covered by large vegetation.

Camp Danao Forest Park is located 335 m. above sea level and 15 km away from the city proper and the sprawling forested area has a man-made lake. It hosted the 2010 BSP (Boy Scout of the Philippines) National Activity. It is also known as the Maasin City Forest Park and played host to the 2010 Boy Scouts of the Philippines National Activity. It is a good destination for those traveling with children because different animals can be seen in the zoo, such as tigers, crocodiles, lions, camels, snakes, monkeys, and several types of birds.

Maasin Zoo and Adventure Park (soft-opening in early 2012). One of the specialties of this zoo will be that the animals will not be kept in cages but be separated from the spectator by “natural” barricades.

Bogo Bird Paradise (private owned), just about 4 km from the city proper is a mountain retreat nestled among flora, fauna and especially rare species of bird.

Busay Falls, where you can find lush vegetation just as well as wildlife cavorting with cascading mountain waterfalls and chirping birds. It can be found in Barangay Combado. 
Sadly, this former completely wild and dreamlike part of nature is victim of fast economic expansion, so water quality is not as good as years ago and the former wild lagoon was removed by a pool.

Abiera Museo d’Art, another sight in Maasin City, showing a rare collection of artifacts, antiques, paintings, preserved animals, coins, gems, and historical relics. Although it is privately owned by the Abiera Family, it can be visited by interested ones. It is located in Barangay Tunga-tunga in the heart of the city.

The Lady of Assumption at the Jalleca Hills is the tallest privately owned shrine in the Philippines. The statue itself and the nearby chapel can be reached by using a stairway with more than 300 steps and is located at 104 m above sea level in Barangay Mantahan. It is one of the most visited religious landmarks in Maasin City and in Southern Leyte. This impressive landmark can be seen from far not only during daytime, but also at night as it is illuminated.

San Francisco Javier Pilgrims Center, a miraculous chapel 400 meters above sea level which can be found in Barangay Hanginan, 7 km from the city proper. It can be reached by an hour-long trek to the top through a foliage of trees and wild shrubs. It is said that every petition is granted and every prayer spoken is answered.

Monte Cueva Shrine, also known as the Shrine of Our Lady of the Assumption and the Most Precious Blood of Jesus, is a donation by the philanthropists Odong and Loring Chung to the Diocese of Maasin. It offers a refuge to pilgrims and devotees. A 30-foot Marian icon perches from a highland over the Via Crucis and Resurrection. A cathedral within the cave is the coup-de-grace to the natural wonder, situated 2 km from Maasin City.

Transportation
Transit Bus Companies:
 Ceres Tours
 Ultrabus
 Silver Star Bus
 Philtranco Bus
 VELMAR Bus Line
 Eagle Star Bus
 CUL Transport
 DLTB
 YZ Transporter
Shipping Companies:
 Cokaliong
 Weesam Express

Healthcare

 New Provincial Hospital - Dongon, Maasin City 
 Living Hope Hospital 
 Sacred Heart Hospital 
 Maasin City Health Unit (3 Branches)
 Maasin Maternity and Children's Hospital
 The College of Maasin Maternity Clinic
 Malaya Medical Clinic
 Abiera Medical Clinic
 Our Lady of Assumption Parish Dialysis Center
 Maasin Dental Spa ( Dental Clinic)
 DMD ToothWorks (Dental Clinic and Diagnostics)

Notable people

 Rodrigo Duterte, 16th President of the Philippines (2016-2022) and it serves as his birthplace.

References

External links

Official website of Maasin City
Official administrative website of Maasin City
 [ Philippine Standard Geographic Code]
Philippine Census Information
Local Governance Performance Management System

 
Cities in Eastern Visayas
Populated places in Southern Leyte
Provincial capitals of the Philippines
Component cities in the Philippines